William Miles Nairne Kington (24 September 1838 – 21 April 1898) was an English army officer and cricketer. 

He was the son of Thomas Kington, the younger (1796–1857), and was educated at Harrow School. In 1858 he was a cornet in the 5th Dragoon Guards. In 1864 he was a captain. He became lieutenant-colonel in the 4th Hussars, and retired in 1880.

Kington played cricket for Manchester in the 1858 season and later for Gloucestershire in 1875 and 1876.

References

External links
Page at thepeerage.com

1838 births
1898 deaths
People educated at Harrow School
4th Queen's Own Hussars officers
English cricketers
Gloucestershire cricketers
Cricketers from Bristol
Manchester Cricket Club cricketers
Gentlemen of Marylebone Cricket Club cricketers
5th Dragoon Guards officers